The Union of Horodło or Pact of Horodło was a set of three acts signed in the town of Horodło on 2 October 1413. The first act was signed by Władysław II Jagiełło, King of Poland, and Vytautas, Grand Duke of Lithuania. The second and third acts were composed by the Polish nobility (szlachta) and Lithuanian boyars, respectively. The union amended the earlier Polish–Lithuanian unions of Krewo and Vilnius–Radom. Politically, Lithuania received more autonomy as, after the death of Vytautas, the Lithuanian nobles could choose another Grand Duke instead of passing the title to Władysław II Jagiełło or his heir. However, culturally, Lithuania and Poland grew closer. Lithuania adopted Polish institutions of castellans and voivodes. Catholic Lithuanian nobles and church officials were granted equal rights with the Polish nobles and clergy. Forty-seven selected Lithuanian nobles were adopted by Polish families and granted Polish coats of arms. Thus the union signified the beginnings of the Polonization of Lithuanian culture and the rise of the Lithuanian nobility. It was one of the major steps towards the modernization and Europeanization of Lithuania.

Historical background
Poland and Lithuania had been joined in a personal union since the Union of Krewo of 1385. Both countries were ruled by Władysław II Jagiełło. However, after the Lithuanian Civil War (1389–1392) and the Ostrów Agreement, Vytautas gained the supreme power in Lithuania. The legal basis for Polish–Lithuanian relations was revisited by the Union of Vilnius and Radom of 1401, which reiterated de facto Lithuanian independence and de jure Polish supremacy. Vytautas was to be known by the title of Grand Duke (magnus dux) and enjoyed vast power in Lithuania, while technically he was subordinate to Władysław II Jagiełło, 'Supreme Duke' (supremus dux) and King of Poland. The union was signed after Vytautas' army was soundly defeated in the Battle of the Vorskla River and weakened Lithuania was looking for Polish support. Taking advantage of the Lithuanian defeat, the Principality of Smolensk, Veliky Novgorod, and Pskov rebelled against Lithuanian rule, drawing Vytautas into a war with the Grand Duchy of Moscow. However, within a few years peace was re-established in the east.

In 1409, the second Samogitian uprising against the Teutonic Knights escalated into the Polish–Lithuanian–Teutonic War. Joint Polish–Lithuanian forces defeated the Knights in the decisive Battle of Grunwald in 1410. However, the war did not resolve all the disputes and by 1413 Poland–Lithuania was preparing for another war with the Knights (see Hunger War). These developments encouraged Poland and Lithuania to review their relationship.

Provisions
The treaty repeated the indissoluble character of the Polish–Lithuanian union while carefully balancing Polish and Lithuanian interests. The Lithuanians gained more autonomy as they received the right to elect a new Grand Duke after the death of Vytautas. The earlier Union of Vilnius and Radom stipulated that Lithuania would pass to Władysław II Jagiełło or his heir. However, the Lithuanian nobles promised to consult the Polish nobles when choosing a successor to Vytautas. The reverse was also true: the Polish nobles promised to consult with the Lithuanians when electing the next Polish King. The pact contained one of the first mentions of the Seimas of the Grand Duchy of Lithuania. The Polish and Lithuanian nobles agreed to hold a joint general sejm to discuss all major matters, but such a sejm did not take place until 1564. Nevertheless, it was a recognition of the political powers of the Lithuanian nobles.

The Lithuanian nobles and clergy were granted equal rights with the Polish nobility and clergy. However, this extended only to Catholics; many Ruthenian nobles, who were Eastern Orthodox, were excluded, however, in 1434, Grand Duke Sigismund repealed some of the provisions in the Horodło acts that limited the political rights of Orthodox believers. It would take until 1563 till there was full equality between the two confessions. Selected Lithuanian nobles, 47 in total, were adopted into Polish heraldic families and granted Polish coats of arm. This symbolic gesture signified their desire to adopt Western customs and integrate into Western society. Equal rights encouraged cooperation and kinship between Polish and Lithuanian nobles. The influence of Polish culture continued to increase, culminating in the Union of Lublin of 1569.

Another significant resolution was the adoption of Polish administrative divisions and offices like voivode and castellan by Lithuania. The union created the Voivodeship of Trakai and Vilnius, governed by two Lithuanian nobles. Former Slavic principalities and duchies largely preserved their old political, social, and administrative features for another century. Kiev Voivodeship was established in 1471, and another five voivodeships were established between 1504 and 1514. This administrative change signified the modernization of the Grand Duchy and a decline of traditional dynastic politics. Previously major regions of the Grand Duchy were ruled by members of the ruling dynasty (siblings, children, cousins, etc. of the Grand Duke). Such principalities remained semi-independent and their rulers could become powerful rivals of the Grand Duke with their own claims to the throne. The new voivodeships were governed by trustworthy nobles, unrelated to the royal clan, who could be easily replaced. Soon the nobility replaced members of the ruling dynasty as the driving force behind Lithuanian politics.

Adopted Polish coat of arms

References

1410s in law
1413 in Europe
15th century in Lithuania
Horodlo
15th century in Poland
Horodło
1410s treaties